The Social Credit System is a national credit rating and blacklist being developed by the government of the People's Republic of China. The social credit initiative calls for the establishment of a record system so that businesses, individuals and government institutions can be tracked and evaluated for trustworthiness. There are multiple, different forms of the social credit system being experimented with, while the national regulatory method is based on blacklisting and whitelisting. The program is mainly focused on businesses and is very fragmented, contrary to the popular misconceptions that it is focused on individuals and is a centralized system.

The origin of the system can be traced back to the 1980s when the Chinese government attempted to develop a personal banking and financial credit rating system, especially for rural individuals and small businesses who lacked documented records. The program first emerged in the early 2000s, inspired by the credit scoring systems in other countries. The program initiated regional trials in 2009, before launching a national pilot with eight credit scoring firms in 2014. It was first introduced formally by then Chinese Premier Wen Jiabao on 20 October 2011, during one of the State Council Meetings.

The Social Credit System is an extension to the existing financial credit rating system in China. Managed by the National Development and Reform Commission (NDRC), the People's Bank of China (PBOC) and Supreme People's Court (SPC), the system was intended to standardize the credit rating function and perform financial and social assessment for businesses, government institutions, individuals and non-government organizations. The Chinese government aims to enhance trust in society with the system and regulate businesses in areas such as food safety, intellectual property theft and financial fraud. 

The Social Credit System has generated a large amount of misreporting and misconceptions in the mass media due to translation errors, sensationalism, conflicting information and lack of comprehensive analysis. Examples of these misconceptions include widespread misassumption that Chinese citizens are rewarded and punished based on a numerical score assigned by the system, that its decisions are taken by AI and that it constantly monitors Chinese citizens.

History

Background
The origin of the Social Credit System can be traced back to the early 1990s as part of attempts to develop personal banking and financial credit rating systems in China, and was inspired by Western commercial credit systems like FICO, Equifax, and TransUnion. The credit system aims to facilitate financial assessment in rural areas, where individuals and small business entities often lacked financial documents. 

The initial blueprints of the Social Credit System was drafted in 2007 by government bodies. The social credit system also attempts to solve the moral vacuum problem, insufficient market supervision and income inequality generated by the rapid economic and social changes since Chinese economic reform in 1978. As a result of these problems, trust issues emerged in Chinese society such as food safety scandals, labor law violation, intellectual property theft and corruption. The policy of the social credit system traces its origin from both policing and work management practices, but the concept itself can trace as far back as the Warring States period to Shang Yang's Legalist meritocratic assessment and promotion system practiced by the imperial bureaucracy to improve the functioning of Chinese state.

The government of modern China has maintained systems of paper records on individuals and households such as the dàng'àn and hùkǒu which officials might refer to, but these systems do not provide the same degree and rapidity of feedback and consequences for Chinese citizens as the integrated electronic system because of the much greater difficulty of aggregating paper records for rapid, robust analysis.

The Social Credit System also originated from grid-style social management, a policing strategy first implemented in select locations from 2001 and 2002 (during the administration of Chinese Communist Party general secretary Jiang Zemin) in specific locations across mainland China. In 2002, the Jiang administration proposed a social credit system as part of the promotion of a "unified, open, competitive, and orderly modern market system." In its first phase, grid-style policing was a system for more effective communication between public security bureaus. Within a few years, the grid system was adapted for use in distributing social services. Grid management provided the authorities not only with greater situational awareness on the group level, but also enhanced the tracking and monitoring of individuals. In 2018, sociologist Zhang Lifan explained that Chinese society today is still deficient in trust. People often expect to be cheated or to get in trouble even if they are innocent. He believes that it is due to the Cultural Revolution, where friends and family members were deliberately pitted against each other and millions of Chinese were killed. The stated purpose of the social credit system is to help Chinese people trust each other again.

Early testing 
In 2013, the Supreme People's Court (SPC) of China started a blacklist of debtors with roughly 32,000 names. The list has since been described as a first step towards a national Social Credit System by state-owned media. The SPC also began working with private companies. For example, Sesame Credit began deducting credit points from people who defaulted on court fines.

In 2015, the People's Bank of China licensed eight companies to begin a trial of social credit systems. Among these eight firms is Sesame Credit (owned by Alibaba Group and operated by Ant Financial), Tencent, as well as China's biggest ride-sharing and online-dating services, Didi Chuxing and Baihe.com, respectively. In general, multiple firms collaborated with the government to develop the system of software and algorithms used to calculate credit. Commercial pilot programs developed by private Chinese conglomerates that have the authorization from the state to test out social credit experiments. The pilots are more widespread than their local government counterparts, but function on a voluntary basis: citizens can decide to opt-out of these systems at any time on request. Users with good scores are offered advantages such as easier access to credit loans, discounts for car and bike sharing services, fast-tracked visa application or free health check-ups and preferential treatment at hospitals. The algorithms used to assign scores in commercial pilot programs remain unknown, although sources say some pilots use a big-data analysis and artificial intelligence approach.

The Chinese central government originally considered having the Social Credit System be run by a private firm, but by 2017, it acknowledged the need for third-party administration. However, no licenses to private companies were granted. By mid-2017, the Chinese government had decided that none of the pilot programs would receive authorization to be official credit reporting systems. The reasons include conflict of interest, the remaining control of the government, as well as the lack of cooperation in data sharing among the firms that participate in the development. However, the Social Credit System's operation by a seemingly external association, such as a formal collaboration between private firms, has not been ruled out yet. In November 2017, Sesame Credit denied that Sesame Credit data was shared with the Chinese government. In 2017, People's Bank of China issued a jointly owned license to Baihang Credit valid for three years. Baihang Credit is co-owned by the National Internet Finance Association (36%) and the eight other companies (8% each), allowing the state to maintain control and oversee the creation of a new commercial pilot programs. As of mid 2018, only pilot schemes had been tested without any official implementation.

Private companies have also signed contracts with provincial governments to set up the basic infrastructure for the Social Credit System at the provincial level. As of March 2017, 137 commercial credit reporting companies were active on the Chinese market. As part of the development of the Social Credit System, the Chinese government has been monitoring the progress of third-party Chinese credit rating systems. Ultimately, Chinese government dropped the support for privately developed credit rating system and these pilot projects remained as corporate loyalty programs.

City trials
In December 2017 the National Development and Reform Commission and People's Bank of China selected "model cities" that demonstrated the steps needed to make a functional and efficient implementation of the Social Credit System. Among them are Hangzhou, Nanjing, Xiamen, Chengdu, Suzhou, Suqian, Huizhou, Wenzhou, Weihai, Weifang, Yiwu and Rongcheng. These pilots were deemed successful in their handling of "blacklists and 'redlists'", their creation of "credit sharing platforms" and their "data sharing efforts with the other cities".

The local government Social Credit System experiments are focused more on the construction of transparent rule-based systems, in contrast with the more advanced rating systems used in the commercial pilots. Citizens often begin with an initial score, to which points are added or deducted depending on their actions. The specific number of points for each action are often listed in publicly available catalogs. Cities also experimented with a multi-level system, in which districts decide on scorekeepers who are responsible for reporting scores to higher-ups. Some experiments also allowed citizens to appeal the scores they were attributed.

As of 2022, over 62 different Social Credit System pilot programs were implemented by local governments. The pilot programs began following the release of the 2014 "Planning Outline for the Construction of a Social Credit System" by Chinese authorities. The government oversees the creation and development of these governmental pilots by requesting they each publish a regular "interdepartmental agreement on joint enforcement of rewards and punishments for 'trustworthy' and 'untrustworthy' conduct." In April 2018, journalist Simina Mistreanu described a community where people's social credit scores were posted near the village center. 

As of 2021, credit systems for local government remained undeveloped and resembled incentivized loyalty programs like those run by airlines. Participation is voluntary and there are no enticement beyond losing access to minor rewards. For fear of overreach and pushback, Chinese central government banned punishments for low scores and minor offences. During the city trials, pilot programs only saw limited participation. Many people living in pilot program cities are unaware of the programs. In Xiamen, 210,059 users activated their social credit account, roughly 5 percent of Xiamen population; 60,000 or 1.5 percent of population in Wuhu participated the system; Hangzhou has 1,872,316 (15 percent) participants and fewer regularly use the system. Scores are not shared between cities as the scoring criteria and mechanisms are different.

Implementation 
In March 2018, Reuters reported that restrictions on citizens and businesses with low social credit ratings and thus low trustworthiness, would come into effect on 1 May 2018. By May 2018, several million flight and high-speed train trips had been denied to people who had been blacklisted; as of March 2019, 13 million people were on the list.

By 2018, some restrictions had been placed on citizens which state-owned media described as the first step toward creating a nationwide social credit system.

In April 2019, the People's Bank of China announced that a new version of the Personal Credit Report would be put out which allows the ability to collect more personal information. State-run media has described it as "more detailed, more comprehensive and more precise."

In a 2022 directive, the State Council stated that it will "actively explore innovative ways to use the credit concept and methods to solve difficulties, bottlenecks, and painful points that restrict the country's economic and social activities."

Hong Kong and Macau 
The Social Credit System will be limited to Mainland China and thus does not apply to Hong Kong and Macau. However, at present, plans do not distinguish between Chinese companies and foreign companies operating on the Chinese market, raising the possibility that foreign businesses operating in China will be subjected to the system as well. The Hong Kong Government stated in July 2019 that claims that the social credit system will be rolled out in Hong Kong are "totally unfounded" and stated that the system will not be implemented there.

General policies 
The Social Credit System is an example of China's "top-level design" approach. It is coordinated by the Central Leading Group for Comprehensively Deepening Reforms. It is unclear whether the system will work as envisioned by 2020, but the Chinese government has fast-tracked the implementation of the system, resulting in the publication of numerous policy documents and plans since the main plan was issued in 2013. If the Social Credit System is implemented as envisioned, it will constitute a new way of controlling both the behavior of individuals and of businesses.

There are multiple social credit systems in China, some of which are designed and operated by the state, while others are operated by private companies. Scholars have conceptualized four different types of systems. These four systems are not interconnected seamlessly, but relatively independent from each other with their own jurisdictions, rules and logic.
Business trustworthiness system Blacklist system for discredited business organizations. This system is regulated by People's Bank of China financial credit-rating system and commercial credit-rating system.
Government trustworthiness system Evaluation system targeting civil servants and government institutions.
Social trustworthiness system Blacklist system for discredited individuals. Social trustworthiness system most closely relates to China's mass surveillance systems.
Judiciary public trust system Blacklist system for discredited individuals. This system is regulated by Supreme People's Court.
In addition to blacklists, the various systems include "red lists" - trustworthy companies and individuals and the related benefits they receive.

Scoring mechanism 
There is no unified, numerical credit score for businesses or individuals, rather national and local platforms use different evaluation or rating systems. Due to the differences in various pilot programs and a fragment system structure, information regarding the scoring mechanism is often conflicting. Inspired by FICO, a numerical social credit score calculated by individual behavior and activities was given to citizens in certain pilot programs developed by financial firms or localized initiatives. However, these practices were not widespread applications and eventually, the numerical score mechanism was limited to private credit rating and loyalty programs. Private involvements were ultimately abandoned by the government. The national regulatory method has been based on blacklisting and whitelisting, which is triggered by specific offenses instead of a low score number. National financial credit reporting for businesses and individuals is provided by the People's Bank of China, which does not assign any numerical scoring.

The Central Government operates a number of national and regional blacklists based on various types of violations. The court system is available for businesses, organizations and individuals to appeal their violations. After being put on the blacklist, it typically takes 2–5 years to be removed from the blacklist, but early removal is also possible if the blacklisted person "fulfills legal obligations or remedies". Blacklist violations for businesses include not paying tax on time, being unable to maintain necessary licenses, producing low-quality goods and disobeying environmental protection policies.

Reward and punishment 

According to the Chinese government's 2015 Plan for Implementation, the Social Credit System was due to be fully implemented by 2020. Once implemented, the system will manage the rewards and punishments for businesses, institutions and individuals on the basis of their economic and personal behavior. Punishments for poor social credit include increased audits and government inspections for businesses, reduced employment prospects, travel bans, exclusion from private schools, slow internet connection, exclusion from high-prestige work, exclusion from hotels and public shaming. Rewards for positive social credit include less frequent inspections and audits for businesses, fast-tracked approvals for government services, discounts on energy bills, being able to rent bikes and hotels without payment of a deposit, better interest rates at banks and tax breaks.

As of June 2019, according to the National Development and Reform Commission of China, 27 million air tickets as well as 6 million high-speed rail tickets had been denied to people who were deemed "untrustworthy" (on a blacklist) and 4.4 million "untrustworthy" people had chosen to fulfill their duties required by the law. Certain personal information of the blacklisted people is deliberately made accessible to the society and is displayed online as well as at various public venues such as movie theaters and buses, while some cities have also banned children of "untrustworthy" residents from attending private schools and even universities. On the other hand, people with high credit ratings may receive rewards such as less waiting time at hospitals and governmental agencies, discounts at hotels, greater likelihood of receiving employment offers and so on.

Examples of policies 
Most initiatives under the social credit system do not involve actual numerical scores, instead documentations of specific offense are recorded in one's credit profiles, the exception being the trial programs launched by some cities and communities. The actual policy varies greatly from city to city and the participation is voluntary. Local credit profiles are not shared between cities. National credit system is regulated by the Supreme Court. The national system is not score-based and is capable of movement restriction.

Enforcement and implications

According to the Chinese government's 2015 Plan for Implementation, the Social Credit System is due to be fully implemented by 2020. Once implemented the system will manage the rewards or punishments, of citizens on the basis of their economic and personal behavior. Some types of punishments for poor social credit include: flight ban, exclusion from private schools, slow internet connection, exclusion from high prestige work, exclusion from hotels and registration on a public blacklist. In contrast, some rewards for good social credit include discounts on energy bills, being able to rent bikes and hotels without payment of a deposit, better interest rates at banks, tax breaks, free use of gyms and preference at Hospitals.

By 14 November 2022 a draft law "Establishment of the Social Credit System" for fine- tuning the Social Credit System was posted for one month.

For businesses
The Social Credit System is meant to provide an answer to the problem of lack of trust on the Chinese market. As of 2020, the corporate regulation function of the system appears to be more advanced than other parts of the system and the "Corporate Social Credit System" has been the primary focus of government attention. As of 2020, over 73.3% of the enforcement action since 2014 is targeted toward business, the largest part of all enforcements. The social credit system is an extension of the risk assessment credit rating systems that were introduced in China in the 1980s. Proponents argue that it will help eliminate problems such as food safety issues, intellectual property theft, violation of labor law, financial infidelity and counterfeit goods. China claims its aim is to enhance trust and social stability by creating a "culture of sincerity".

For businesses, the Social Credit System is meant to serve as a market regulation mechanism. The goal is to establish a self-enforcing regulatory regime fueled by big data in which businesses exercise "self-restraint" (企业自我约束). The basic idea is that with a functional credit system in place, companies will comply with government policies and regulations to avoid having their scores lowered by disgruntled employees, customers or clients. For example, the central government can use social credit data to offer risk-assessed grants and loans to small and medium enterprises (SMEs), encouraging banks to offer greater loan access for SMEs.

As currently envisioned, companies with good credit scores will enjoy benefits such as good credit conditions, lower tax rates, less custom checks, and more investment opportunities. Companies with bad credit scores will potentially face unfavorable conditions for new loans, higher tax rates, investment restrictions and lower chances to participate in publicly funded projects. Government plans also envision real-time monitoring of a business's activities. In that case, infractions on the part of a business could result in a lower score almost instantly. However, whether this will actually happen depends on the future implementation of the system as well as on the availability of technology needed for this kind of monitoring.

To improve credit score, companies need to conform to the government rules, such as following the COVID-19 containment guidelines.

For government institutions
Government institutions receive the second highest number of enforcement actions, accounting for 13.3% of the penalties as of 2020. The social credit system targets government agencies, assesses local governments' performance and focuses on financial problems such as local governments' debts and contract defaults. Beijing hopes the system can improve "government self-discipline". Local governments are also encouraged and rewarded by the social credit system if they successfully implement and follow the orders from the central government.

For individuals 
As of 2020, individuals receive 10.3% of all enforcement actions. The social credit system primarily focuses on the financial trustworthiness of individual citizens. One major focus is that of the debt-dodger (laolai), a phrase which refers to those who can pay their debts but choose not to. A laolai blacklist is maintained by the Supreme People's Court.

A Hebei court released an app showing a "map of deadbeat debtors" within 500 meters and encouraged users to report individuals who they believed could repay their debts. A spokesman of the court stated that "It's a part of our measures to enforce our rulings and create a socially credible environment." Future rewards of having a high score might include easier access to loans and jobs and priority during bureaucratic paperwork. Likewise, the immediate negative consequences for a low score or potentially being associated to someone with a low score, might range from lower internet speeds to being denied access to certain jobs and loans.

In addition to dishonest and fraudulent financial behavior, there are other behaviors that some cities have officially listed as negative factors of credit ratings includes playing loud music or eating in rapid transits, violating traffic rules such as jaywalking and red-light violations, making reservations at restaurants or hotels, but not showing up, failing to correctly sort personal waste, fraudulently using other people's public transportation ID cards, etc.; on the other hand, behavior listed as positive factors of credit ratings includes donating blood, donating to charity, volunteering for community services, praising government efforts on social media and so on.

There are various punishments for low trustworthiness. As of June 2019, according to the National Development and Reform Commission of China, 26.82 million air tickets as well as 5.96 million high-speed rail tickets had been denied to people who were deemed "untrustworthy()" (on a blacklist) and 4.37 million "dishonest" people had chosen to fulfill their duties required by the law. Delinquent debtors are placed on blacklists maintained by Chinese courts and shared with the Ministry of Public Security which controls the country's entry-exit checkpoints. Individuals with outstanding debts can be subject to exit bans and prevented from leaving the country as a way of encouraging or forcing the collection of debt. According to the Financial Times, as of 2017, some 6.7 million people had already been placed on blacklists and prevented from exiting the country as a result of the new policy. In July 2019, additional 2.56 million flight tickets as well as 90 thousand high-speed train tickets were denied to those on the blacklist. If the parents of a child were to have low enough social credit, their children would be excluded from the private schools in the region or even national universities. A person with a poor social credit may be denied employment in places as banks, State-owned enterprises or as a business executive. The Chinese government encourages checking whether candidates names' appear on the blacklist when hiring.

Certain websites allow users to display their social credit score as a prestige symbol. For example, China's biggest matchmaking service, Baihe, allows its users to publish their own score. In certain test programs, public humiliation is used as a mechanism to deter poor social credit scores. Mugshots of blacklisted individuals are sometimes displayed on large LED screens on buildings or shown before the movie in movie theaters.

According to Sarah Cook of Freedom House, city-level pilot projects for the social credit system have included rewarding individuals for aiding authorities in enforcing restrictions of religious practices, including coercing practitioners of Falun Gong to renounce their beliefs and reporting on Uighurs who publicly pray, fast during Ramadan or perform other Islamic practices.

For social organizations
As of 2020, non-government organizations receive 3.3% of all enforcement actions. Although the enforcement remain a small group in numerical terms, but their inclusion has an important implication as it affects foreign NGOs operated within China.

Public opinions

Approvals

 In a 2018 study, 80% of respondents either strongly approved or approved of China's Social Credit System, while one percent disapproved. The study was conducted by Professor Genia Kostka of Free University of Berlin and was based on a cross-regional internet survey of 2,209 Chinese citizens of various backgrounds. The study found "a surprisingly high degree of approval of SCSs across respondent groups" and that "more socially advantaged citizens (wealthier, better-educated and urban residents) show the strongest approval of SCSs, along with older people". Kostka explained in the paper that "while one might expect such knowledgeable citizens to be most concerned about the privacy implications of SCS, they instead appear to embrace SCSs because they interpret it through frames of benefit-generation and promoting honest dealings in society and the economy instead of privacy-violation."
In August 2019, assistant researcher Zhengjie Fan of China Institute of International Studies published an article, claiming that the current punishment policies such as the blacklist do not overstep the limits of law. He argued that since 2014, China's Social Credit System and the credit system of the market had grown to complement each other, forming a mutually beneficial interaction. According to Doing Business 2019 by World Bank Group which ranks "190 countries on the ease of doing business within their borders", China rose from 78th place in previous year to 46th place and Fan claimed that the Social Credit System has played an important role.

Criticism 

China's Social Credit System has been implicated in a number of controversies, especially given that CCP general secretary Xi Jinping and his government have publicly opposed constitutionalism, separation of powers and judicial independence. Of particular note is how it is applied to individuals as well as companies, whether it is lawful and whether it leads to totalitarianism. People have already faced various punishments for violating social protocols. As of June 2019, the system has already been used to block the purchase of over 26 million domestic flight tickets from people who were deemed "dishonest". While still in the preliminary stages, the system has been used to ban people and their children from certain private schools, prevent low scorers from renting hotels, using credit cards and blacklist individuals from being able to procure employment.

 In May 2020, Chinese investigative media group Caixin reported that business social credit systems in China were insufficient in deterring problematic business activities and that the social credit system was easy to game in the favour of businesses.
 In October 2019, Professor Kui Shen of the Law School of Peking University published a paper in China Legal Science, suggesting that some of the current credit policies violated the "rule of law" or "Rechtsstaat": that they infringed the legal rights of residents and organizations, possibly violated the principle of respecting and protecting human rights, especially the right to reputation, the right to privacy as well as personal dignity and overstepped the boundary of reasonable punishment.
In June 2019, Samantha Hoffman of Australian Strategic Policy Institute argued that "there are no genuine protections for the people and entities subject to the system... In China there is no such thing as the rule of law. Regulations that can be largely apolitical on the surface can be political when the Chinese Communist Party (CCP) decides to use them for political purposes."
In January 2019, George Soros criticized the social credit system, saying it would give CCP leader Xi Jinping "total control over the people of China".
In October 2018, U.S. Vice President Mike Pence criticized the social credit system, describing it as "an Orwellian system premised on controlling virtually every facet of human life."
In August 2018, Professor Genia Kostka of Free University of Berlin stated in her published paper (also cited under "Approvals" above) that "if successful in [their] effort, the Communist Party will possess a powerful means of quelling dissent, one that is comparatively low-cost and which does not require the overt (and unpopular) use of coercion by the state."
In May 2018, The Hill noted that "the totalitarian 1984 of the future is now 2018 China."
From 2017 to 2018, researchers argued that the credit system will be part of the government's plan to automate their authoritarian rule over the Chinese population.
In December 2017, Human Rights Watch described the proposed social credit system as "chilling" and filled with arbitrary abuses.
Online news Wired UK published concerns from journalist Liu Hu who "was named on a List of Dishonest Persons Subject to Enforcement by the Supreme People's Court as "not qualified" to buy a plane ticket and banned from travelling some train lines, buying property or taking out a loan". He said this was "really scary... You can report to no one. You are stuck in the middle of nowhere."

Misconceptions 
 In July 2019, Wired reported that there existed misconceptions regarding the Social Credit System of China. It argued that "Western concerns about what could happen with China's Social Credit System have in some ways outstripped discussions about what's already really occurring...The exaggerated portrayals may also help to downplay surveillance efforts in other parts of the world." The rise of misconception, according to Jeremy Daum of Yale University, is contributed by translation errors, the difference in word usage and so on.
 In May 2019, Logic published an article by Shazeda Ahmed, who argued that "[f]oreign media has distorted the social credit system into a technological dystopia far removed from what is actually happening in China." She pointed out that common misconceptions included the beliefs that surveillance data is connected with a centralized database; that human activities online and offline are assigned with actual values that can be deducted and that every citizen in China has a numerical score that is calculated by computer algorithm.
 In March and February 2019, MIT Technology Review stated that, "[i]n the West, the system is highly controversial and often portrayed as an AI-powered surveillance regime that violates human rights." However, the magazine reported that "many scholars argue that social credit scores won't have the wide-scale controlling effect presumed...the system acts more as a tool of propaganda than a tool of enforcement" and that "[o]thers point out that it is simply an extension of Chinese culture's long tradition of promoting good moral behavior and that Chinese citizens have a completely different perspective on privacy and freedom."
 In November 2018, Foreign Policy listed some factors which contributed to the misconception of China's credit system. The potential factors included the scale and variety of the social credit system program and the difficulties of comprehensive reporting that comes with it.
 In May 2018, Rogier Creemers of Leiden University stated that despite the Chinese government's intentions of utilizing big data and artificial intelligence, the regulatory method of SCS remained relatively crude. His research concluded that it is "... perhaps more accurate to conceive of the SCS as an ecosystem of initiatives broadly sharing a similar underlying logic, than a fully unified and integrated machine for social control."
 In November 2018, Bing Song, director of the Berggruen Institute China Center, posted an opinion piece in The Washington Post, arguing that the Western media and institutions have misreported the details and mechanics of the Social Credit system. The article suggested that media have confused private score reporting mechanisms with the national system. He also noted that penalties are executed based on the Supreme Court laws and regulations, while private scoring companies and government agencies are not capable of enacting penalties. He argued the widespread media reports often ignored the fact that local governments can be targeted in the blacklists and the scoring systems and its effects were exaggerated by many media stories. He also argued that the cultural expectations of the government and its role in China are different than that of in other countries.
 In March 2021, The Diplomat remarked that the assumption by Western observers that the Social Credit System is an Orwellian surveillance system exaggerates the reality and purpose of the system in real life. Despite the claim, the social credit system is "an extension of bond issuance risk assessment credit ratings introduced in China in the 1980s" and primarily serves the function of a financial risk assessment tool.
 In October 2021, The Washington-based think tank The Jamestown Foundation explored the function of the Social Credit System and concluded that there're widespread misinterpretations regarding the function and mechanism of the SCS. The think tank found that misinformed perceptions of an algorithm-driven citizen-rating system are originated from early analyses that confused the regulation-enforcement mechanisms and the morality propaganda campaigns of the SCS initiative. Furthermore, many failed to distinguish between the government regulations and the private credit rating systems. Corporations hyperbolically promoted the scores' predictive abilities, which may have resonated with Western anxiety and concerns surrounding corporate data collection and government access to personal information.
 In 2022, academics Diana Fu and Rui Hou noted the persistence of Western misconceptions in their article Rating Citizens with China's Social Credit System, stating, "Western media articles initially compared the system to an episode of the British sci-fi series Black Mirror in which individuals' every day behavior, down to the minutiae, were tracked and rated by other people and a "big brother" government. Since then, scholars and journalists have sought to dispel this dystopian depiction of the social credit system, but the image continued to live on, particularly after the Trump administration started to use it as part of its anti-China policy in 2017 and 2018."

In popular culture

 In 2021, the social credit system was popularized as an internet meme on various social media platforms. VICE reported that the memes' popularity reflects the "widespread discontent toward the Chinese government over its restrictions of people's freedoms", however the article noted the trend continued the existing misapprehension and misinformation regarding the SCS mechanism, such as people in China are rewarded/punished based on a numerical "social credit score". The joke is posed as something being positive or negative towards the Chinese government being joked as affecting the poster's "social credit score" positively or negatively.

Comparison to other countries

Chile
Since the year 1976, a database of loan debtors (the Directory of Commercial Information, DICOM) has been implemented to evaluate the financial and commercial risk of an individual or enterprise. People listed in DICOM find it harder to find housing, start businesses, get new loans and, though not the intended usage of the system, find jobs, since employers tend to check scores as a part of the selection process. There have been legal measures taken recently to reduce the negative impact of the system on people, such as banning the usage of DICOM status in determining access to medical attention and lawmakers derogating the DICOM status for educational loans. Once the debt has been paid, renegotiated or prescript, the debtor gets out of the list. There are also law firms that offer legal mechanisms to change the nature of the debt and invalidate the DICOM status.

Germany
In February 2018, Handelsblatt Global reported that Germany may be "sleep walking" towards a system comparable to China's. Data from the universal credit rating system Schufa, geolocation and health records are being used to determine access to credit and health insurance.

Russia 
Around 80% of Russians will reportedly get a digital profile that will document personal successes and failures in less than a decade under the government's comprehensive plans to digitize the economy. Observers have compared this to China's social credit system, although Deputy Prime Minister Maxim Akimov has denied that, saying a Chinese-style social credit system is a "threat".

United Kingdom
In 2018, the New Economics Foundation compared the Chinese citizen score to other rating systems in the United Kingdom. These included using data from a citizen's credit score, phone usage, rent payment and so on, to filter job applications, determine access to social services, determine advertisements served, etc. The difference between the two systems is that the credit rating system in the UK is just for loaning of monies from organisation to individuals based on their previous financial activities. The Social Credit System is more qualitative and relies on people's perception of others’ "behaviour".

United States

Some media outlets have compared the social credit system to credit scoring systems in the United States. According to Fast Company, "increasing number of societal "privileges" related to transportation, accommodations, communications and the rates US citizens pay for services (like insurance) are either controlled by technology companies or affected by how we use technology services."  In addition, Silicon Valley's rules for being allowed to use their services are getting stricter."

Venezuela 

In 2017, Venezuela started developing a smart-card ID known as the "carnet de la patria" or "fatherland card", with the help of the Chinese telecom company ZTE. The system included a database which stores details like birthdays, family information, employment and income, property owned, medical history, state benefits received, presence on social media, membership of a political party and whether a person voted. Many in Venezuela have expressed concern that the card is an attempt to tighten social control through monitoring all aspects of daily life.

References

External links

Mass surveillance
Data
Reputation management
 
Credit scoring
Nudge theory
Social status
Social systems
Social influence
Politics of China
 
Social information processing
Technology in society

Government by algorithm
Human rights abuses in China
Internet memes introduced in 2021